Holdout or Hold Out may refer to:

Sports
Holdout (sports), a player’s refusal to report to their team or failure to perform the services outlined in the terms of their contract

Media
 "Hold Out" (Tom Robinson song), a 1979 song by the Tom Robinson Band on the album TRB Two
 Hold Out, a 1980 album by Jackson Browne
 "Hold Out" (Matthew Saunoa song), a 2006 song by Matthew Saunoa
 "Hold Out" (Sam Fender song), 2020

Real estate
 Holdout (architecture), a property that did not become part of a larger development
 A holdout (seller) in real estate transactions, who refuses to negotiate with buyers who have a bid that is lower than the initial asking price

Other
 Holdout (gambling), a device used to cheat in gambling
 Holdout problem, in finance concerning bond redemption
 Holdout weapon, a weapon, typically a pistol, which can be sneaked into areas where weapons are normally confiscated or prohibited
 Japanese holdout, a World War II soldier in the Pacific who continued to fight after Japan surrendered
 Holdout data set, in statistics and machine learning, data that has not been used to derive a model